Büyük Doğu (Turkish: The Great East) was a right-wing conservative political publication which was started as a daily newspaper and later relaunched as a weekly magazine. The publication was a platform for its founder, Necip Fazıl Kısakürek, to disseminate his arguments and views. It was in circulation between 1943 and 1978 with some intervals and produced a total of 512 issues.

History and profile

Newspaper edition
Büyük Doğu was first published as a daily newspaper on 17 September 1943 with the aim of being a newspaper for Muslim Turkish people who were committed to the God and a new worldview. Therefore, it aimed at teaching people about their faith.

Its founder was a significant right-wing and conservative figure, Necip Fazıl Kısakürek. The contributors of Büyük Doğu included many leading journalists and writers: Ziya Şakir, Mahmut Yesari, Reşat Ekrem Koçu, Nurullah Berk, Hilmi Ziya Ülken, Mehmet Faruk Gürtunca, Suphi Nuri İleri, Hüseyin Cahit Yalçın, Nizamettin Nazif, Nejat Muhsinoğlu, Peyami Safa, Şükrü Baban, Burhan Belge, Kazım Nami, Salih Zeki, Tevfik Fikret, Özdemir Asaf, İskender Fikret, Kenan Harun, Salah Birsel, Mehmet Turhan and Sait Faik. Islamist journalist Cevat Rıfat Atilhan also wrote for the magazine in addition to Sebilürreşad, another conservative magazine. Although such a wide variety of writers published articles in Büyük Doğu, most of the articles were written by Necip Fazıl Kısakürek who employed numerous pseudonyms.

The paper was one of the fierce critics of secularism in Turkey. On 2 November 1943 Büyük Doğu newspaper was banned due to the articles which were written by Necip Fazıl Kısakürek under different pseudonyms.

Magazine edition
In 1945 Büyük Doğu was restarted as a weekly magazine. It continued its opposition against the ruling party, Republican People's Party, and was critical of the employment of women. When the Democrat Party won the elections and formed the government in 1950, the magazine did not support the party due to its moderate approach. However, Büyük Doğu became one of the pro-DP publications over time.

In addition to political content the magazine featured several examples of the symbolist poems which were formalized in a former literary magazine Dergâh. Büyük Doğu was banned and ceased publication on 5 June 1978 after publishing 512 issues. During its lifetime it was shut down at least thirteen times.

References

1943 establishments in Turkey
1978 disestablishments in Turkey
Banned newspapers
Censorship in Turkey
Conservatism in Turkey
Conservative magazines
Defunct newspapers published in Turkey
Defunct political magazines published in Turkey
Magazines established in 1945
Magazines disestablished in 1978
Magazines published in Istanbul
Newspapers established in 1943
Publications disestablished in 1943
Turkish-language magazines
Weekly magazines published in Turkey
Poetry literary magazines
Literary magazines published in Turkey
Banned magazines